Madonna and Child is an oil on panel painting by Giovanni Antonio Boltraffio, now in the National Gallery, London. It was probably produced c. 1493-1499. It is influenced by Leonardo da Vinci, derived from Boltraffio's time in that artist's Milanese studio.

References

Paintings of the Madonna and Child
Collections of the National Gallery, London
Paintings by Giovanni Antonio Boltraffio
1490s paintings